The 1985 Italian local elections were held on 12 and 13 May. The elections were held in 6,562 municipalities and 86 provinces. 

The elections were won by the Christian Democracy, led by Ciriaco De Mita. The election was also characterized by a strong result of the Italian Social Movement, which became the most voted party in the city of Bolzano in South Tyrol.

Municipal elections in the main cities

Provincial elections

References

External links

1985 elections in Italy
 
Municipal elections in Italy
May 1985 events in Europe